"In Motion" is a song by Australian rapper Allday featuring Japanese Wallpaper. It was released in March 2017 as the third and final single from the Allday's second studio album Speeding. The singles was certified gold in Australia in 2018.

Track listing
Digital download
 "In Motion" – 3:43

Certifications

References

Allday songs
2016 songs
2016 singles
Songs written by Allday